In soil science, peds are aggregates of soil particles formed as a result of pedogenic processes; this natural organization of particles forms discrete units separated by pores or voids. The term is generally used for macroscopic (visible; i.e. greater than 1 mm in size) structural units when observing soils in the field. Soil peds should be described when the soil is dry or slightly moist, as they can be difficult to distinguish when wet.

There are five major classes of macrostructure seen in soils:  platy, prismatic, columnar, granular, and blocky.  There are also structureless conditions. Some soils have simple structure, each unit being an entity without component smaller units. Others have compound structure, in which large units are composed of smaller units separated by persistent planes of weakness.

Types of soil structures

Platy

In platy structure, the units are flat and platelike. They are generally oriented horizontally. A special form, lenticular platy structure, is recognized for plates that are thickest in the middle and thin toward the edges. Platy structure is usually found in subsurface soils that have been subject to leaching or compaction by animals or machinery. The plates can be separated with a little effort by prying the horizontal layers with a pen knife. Platy structure tends to impede the downward movement of water and plant roots through the soil.

They are found most frequently in the C, E, Bs and K horizons as well as in sesquioxides (very old soils that are rich in iron and magnesium).

Prismatic

In the prismatic structure, the individual units are bounded by flat to rounded vertical faces. Units are distinctly longer vertically, and the faces are typically casts or molds of adjoining units. Vertices are angular or subrounded; the tops of the prisms are somewhat indistinct and normally flat. Prismatic structures are characteristic of the B horizons or subsoils. The vertical cracks result from freezing and thawing and wetting and drying as well as the downward movement of water and roots.

Columnar

In the columnar structure, the units are similar to prisms and are bounded by flat or slightly rounded vertical faces. The tops of columns, in contrast to those of prisms, are very distinct and normally rounded. Columnar structure is common in the subsoil of sodium affected soils and soils rich in swelling clays such as the smectites and the kandite Halloysite. Columnar structure is very dense and it is very difficult for plant roots to penetrate these layers. Techniques such as deep plowing have help to restore some degree of fertility to these soils.

Blocky

In blocky structure, the structural units are blocklike or polyhedral. They are bounded by flat or slightly rounded surfaces that are casts of the faces of surrounding peds. Typically, blocky structural units are nearly equidimensional but grade to prisms and to plates. The structure is described as angular blocky if the faces intersect at relatively sharp angles; as subangular blocky if the faces are a mixture of rounded and plane faces and the corners are mostly rounded. Blocky structures are common in subsoil but also occur in surface soils that have a high clay content. The strongest blocky structure is formed as a result of swelling and shrinking of the clay minerals which produce cracks. Sometimes the surface of dried-up sloughs and ponds shows characteristic cracking and peeling due to clays.

Granular

In the granular structure, the structural units are approximately spherical or polyhedral and are bounded by curved or very irregular faces that are not casts of adjoining peds. In other words, they look like cookie crumbs. Granular structure is common in the surface soils of rich grasslands and highly amended garden soils with high organic matter content. Soil mineral particles are both separated and bridged by organic matter breakdown products, and soil biota exudates, making the soil easy to work. Cultivation, earthworms, frost action and rodents mix the soil and decreases the size of the peds. This structure allows for good porosity and easy movement of air and water. This combination of ease in tillage, good moisture and air handling capabilities, and good structure for planting and germination, are definitive of the phrase good tilth.

See also

Soil structure
Soil type
Soil horizon

References

Soil